Andre Williams may refer to:

 Andre Williams (musician)
 Andre Williams (American football)
 Andre Williams, British DJ better known as Shy FX